Chhin Chhoeun (born 9 April 1992) is a former Cambodian footballer who last played for Tiffy Army  in the Cambodian Premier League and the Cambodia national football team. Mainly a right winger, he can also play as a striker or a right-back.

International goals
As of 2 June 2016. Final score listed first, with Cambodia's goals listed in bold. "Score" column indicates the score after each goal by Chhoeun.

Honours

Club
National Defense Ministry
Hun Sen Cup: 2010, 2016

References

External links 
 

1989 births
Living people
People from Prey Veng province
Cambodian footballers
Cambodia international footballers
Association football forwards